Serkan Bakan (born 1 January 2001) is a Turkish footballer who plays as a midfielder for Ağrı 1970 SK.

Professional career
Serkan made his professional debut for Gaziantepspor in a 4-0 Süper Lig loss to Beşiktaş on 28 May 2017. He was 16 years and 147 days of age, making him the third youngest player to debut for the Süper Lig. Serkan scored in his second professional game, a 4-1 loss to Antalyaspor on 2 June 2017, making him the first player born in the 21st century to score in the Süper Lig.

References

External links
 
 
 
 Kicker Profile

2001 births
People from Şehitkamil
Living people
Turkish footballers
Turkey youth international footballers
Association football midfielders
Gaziantepspor footballers
Göztepe S.K. footballers
Edirnespor footballers
Süper Lig players
TFF Third League players